The  Washington Redskins season was the franchise's 23rd season in the National Football League (NFL) and their 17th in Washington, D.C.  The team failed to improve on their 6–5–1 record from 1953. The Redskins sent defensive back Don Paul to the Cleveland Browns. The Redskins acquired Paul from the Chicago Cardinals. Upon his arrival in Washington, he fell in displeasure with George Preston Marshall of the Redskins.

Schedule

Standings

References

Washington
Washington Redskins seasons
Washing